Percy Daggs III (born July 20, 1982) is an American actor best known for his role as Wallace Fennel in the Rob Thomas television series Veronica Mars.  He is also known for starring in television commercials for Hot Pockets and Orbit Gum.  He has had guest appearances on such shows as Boston Public, The Guardian, NYPD Blue and The Nightmare Room.
His younger sister was featured on MTV's Made as an aspiring surfer.

Filmography

Film

Television

Web series

References

External links
 
 

1982 births
Living people
African-American male actors
American male child actors
American male film actors
American male television actors
Male actors from Long Beach, California
21st-century African-American people
20th-century African-American people
Long Beach Polytechnic High School alumni